Kaunas (previously known in English as Kovno, also see other names) is the second-largest city in Lithuania after Vilnius and an important centre of Lithuanian economic, academic, and cultural life. Kaunas was the largest city and the centre of a county in the Duchy of Trakai of the Grand Duchy of Lithuania and Trakai Palatinate since 1413. In the Russian Empire, it was the capital of the Kaunas Governorate from 1843 to 1915.

During the interwar period, it served as the temporary capital of Lithuania, when Vilnius was seized and controlled by Poland between 1920 and 1939. During that period Kaunas was celebrated for its rich cultural and academic life, fashion, construction of countless Art Deco and Lithuanian National Romanticism architectural-style buildings as well as popular furniture, the interior design of the time, and a widespread café culture. The city interwar architecture is regarded as among the finest examples of European Art Deco and has received the European Heritage Label. It contributed to Kaunas being named as the first city in Central and Eastern Europe to be designated as a UNESCO City of Design. Kaunas was selected as the European Capital of Culture for 2022, together with Esch-sur-Alzette, Luxembourg and 

The city is the capital of Kaunas County, and the seat of the Kaunas city municipality and the Kaunas District Municipality. It is also the seat of the Roman Catholic Archdiocese of Kaunas. Kaunas is located at the confluence of the two largest Lithuanian rivers, the Nemunas and the Neris, and is near the Kaunas Reservoir, the largest body of water in the whole of Lithuania.

As defined by Eurostat, the population of Kaunas functional urban area, is estimated at 383,764 ( 2017), while according to statistics of Kaunas territorial health insurance fund, there are 447,946 permanent inhabitants (as of 2022) in Kaunas and Kaunas district municipalities combined.

Etymology
The city's name is of Lithuanian origin and most likely derives from a personal name. Before Lithuania regained independence, the city was generally known in English as Kovno, the traditional Slavicized form of its name. The city and its elderates also have names in other languages (see Names of Kaunas in other languages and names of Kaunas elderates in other languages).

Folk history
A 16th century legend claims, that Kaunas was established by the Romans in ancient times. These Romans were supposedly led by a patrician named Palemon, who had three sons: Barcus, Kunas and Sperus. Palemon fled from Rome because he feared the mad Emperor Nero. Palemon, his sons and other relatives travelled to Lithuania. After Palemon's death, his sons divided his land. Kunas got the land where Kaunas now stands. He built a fortress near the confluence of the Nemunas and Neris rivers and the city that grew up there was named after him. A suburban region in the vicinity is named "Palemonas".

Coat of arms

In 1408 Vytautas the Great granted Kaunas the city rights and himself chose the coat of arms of Kaunas with aurochs.

On 30 June 1993, the historical coat of arms of Kaunas city was re-established by a special presidential decree. The coat of arms features a white aurochs with a golden cross between its horns, set against a deep red background. The aurochs was the original heraldic symbol of the city, established in 1400. The heraldic seal of Kaunas, introduced in the early 15th century during the reign of Grand Duke Vytautas, is the oldest city heraldic seal known in the territory of the Grand Duchy of Lithuania. The current emblem was the result of much study and discussion on the part of the Lithuanian Heraldry Commission, and realized by the artist Raimondas Miknevičius. An aurochs has replaced a wisent, which was depicted in the Soviet-era emblem that was used since 1969.

Blazon: Gules, an aurochs passant guardant argent ensigned with a cross Or between his horns.

Kaunas also has a greater coat of arms, which is mainly used for purposes of Kaunas city representation. The sailor, three golden balls, and Latin text "Diligite justitiam qui judicatis terram" (English: Cherish justice, you who judge the earth) in the greater coat of arms refers to Saint Nicholas, patron saint of merchants and seafarers, who was regarded as a heavenly guardian of Kaunas by Queen Bona Sforza.

History

Early history

According to the archeological excavations, the richest collections of ceramics and other artifacts found at the confluence of the Nemunas and the Neris rivers are from the second and first millennium BC. During that time, people settled in some territories of the present Kaunas: the confluence of the two longest rivers of Lithuania area, Eiguliai, Lampėdžiai, Linkuva, Kaniūkai, Marvelė, Pajiesys, Romainiai, Petrašiūnai, Sargėnai, and Veršvai sites.

Grand Duchy of Lithuania

A settlement had been established on the site of the current Kaunas Old Town, at the confluence of two large rivers, at least by the 10th century AD and more settlements were developed in the 11th century AD. Kaunas was first mentioned in written sources in 1361 and at the end of the 13th century the brick Kaunas Castle was constructed to defend the residents from attacks of the Teutonic Order. At the time only two brick castles stood near the Nemunas River (in Kaunas and Grodno), which was the main front line of fights between the Crusaders and Lithuanians. Consequently, the Kaunas Castle had a strategic importance as it prevented the Crusaders from intruding deeper into Lithuania and capital Vilnius. Nevertheless, in 1362 the castle was captured after a several weeks siege and destroyed by the Teutonic Order. Lithuanian rulers Kęstutis and Grand Duke Algirdas arrived to assist the castle's defenders, but the castle was already surrounded by the fortifications of the Crusaders and they could only watch the collapse of the castle. Most of the 400 castle's defenders were killed in action and commander Vaidotas of the Kaunas Castle garrison tried to break through with 36 men but was taken prisoner. It was one of the largest and most important military victory of the Teutonic Knights in the 14th century against the Grand Duchy of Lithuania.

The Lithuanians constructed new wooden castle in the island of Virgalė (there was once an island at the confluence of the Nemunas and Nevėžio rivers), however it was burned down in 1363 by the Crusaders. The wooden castle was rebuilt, but in 1368 the Crusaders attacked once again, destroyed the castle and according to the chronicles killed 600 pagan defenders by suffering only three casualties. The Lithuanians attempted to rebuilt the castle as masonry with higher, wider walls, four flanking towers and surrounded by a moat, but before its completion the Crusaders attacked in the summer of 1369, expelled the Lithuanians from the island of Virgalė and constructed their masonry Gotteswerder Castle. The Gotteswerder Castle was captured after a five-week siege by the Grand Ducal Lithuanian Army led by Algirdas and Kęstutis and two wooden castles were built near it. Nevertheless, the fighting between the Crusaders and Lithuanians continued for the area until it finally passed to the Lithuanians in 1404 and was an important point during the 1409 Samogitian Rebellion and the 1410 war with the Crusaders. Grand Duke Vytautas the Great funded Church of the Assumption of the Blessed Virgin Mary in Kaunas (construction was completed in 1400) to show his gratitude to Virgin Mary for saving him from almost drowning in the river during the Battle of the Vorskla River in 1399. Following the Battle of Grunwald in 1410, the Kaunas Castle became a residence of the elder of Kaunas and its military significance decreased.

In 1408, the town was granted Magdeburg rights by Vytautas the Great and became a centre of Kaunas Powiat in Trakai Voivodeship in 1413. Moreover, Vytautas ceded Kaunas the right to own the scales used for weighing the goods brought to the city or packed on site, wax processing, and woolen cloth-trimming facilities. The power of the self-governing Kaunas was shared by three interrelated major institutions: vaitas (the Mayor), the Magistrate (12 lay judges and 4 burgomasters), and the so-called Benchers' Court (12 persons). Kaunas began to gain prominence, since it was at an intersection of trade routes and a river port. At the time Kaunas became an important trade center and port with Western Europe, thus grew rapidly. In 1441 Kaunas joined the Hanseatic League, and Hansa merchant office Kontor was opened – the only one in the Grand Duchy of Lithuania.

By the 16th century, Kaunas also had a public school and a hospital and was one of the best-formed towns in the whole country. Furthermore, in the 16th century Grand Duchess Bona Sforza achieved that the Kaunas Eldership to become a property of the Jagiellonian dynasty and since 1533 she carried out the Volok Reform.

The greatest economic boom of Kaunas was in the late 16th – early 17th century which led to construction of many brick masonry buildings throughout the city. In the early 17th century, the Kaunas' prosperity led to the beginning of the construction of the Wall of Kaunas, however it was not completed due to later wars and economic reasons. In 1665, the Russian army attacked the city several times, and in 1701 the city was occupied by the Swedish Army during the Great Northern War. The bubonic plague struck the area in 1657 and 1708, killing many residents. Fires destroyed parts of the city in 1731 and 1732.

At the first half of the 18th century the northern wall and two towers of the Kaunas Castle collapsed due to damage by river water, which led to abandonment of the castle and it turned into ruins. Subsequently a jail was established in part of the castle at the middle of the 18th century. At the end of the 18th century the castle was sometimes used to hold meetings of noble families of the Kaunas Powiat.

Russian Empire

After the third and final partition of the Polish–Lithuanian state in 1795, the city was taken over by the Russian Empire and became a part of Vilna Governorate. During the French invasion of Russia in 1812, the Grand Army of Napoleon passed through Kaunas twice, devastating the city both times. A hill fort mound in Kaunas is named Napoleon's Hill.

To prevent possible easy access through the city and protect the western borders of Russia, the Kovno Fortress was built. It is still visible throughout the town.

Kovno Governorate, with a centre in Kovno (Kaunas), was formed in 1843. In 1862, a railway connecting the Russian Empire and Imperial Germany was built, making Kaunas a significant railway hub with one of the first railway tunnels in the Empire, completed in 1861. In 1898 the first power plant in Lithuania started operating.

After the unsuccessful January Uprising in 1863 against the Russian Empire, the tsarist authority moved the Catholic Seminary of Varniai, prominent bishop Motiejus Valančius and Samogitian diocese institutions to Kaunas, where they were given the former Bernardine Monastery Palace and St. George the Martyr Church. Only selected noblemen were permitted to study in the Seminary, with the only exception being peasant son Antanas Baranauskas, who illegally received the nobleman documents from Karolina Praniauskaitė. He began lectures using the Lithuanian language, rather than Russian, and greatly influenced the spirit of the seminarians by narrating about the ancient Lithuania and especially its earthwork mounds. Later, many of the Seminary students were active in Lithuanian book smuggling; its chief main objective was to resist the Russification policy. Kaunas Spiritual Seminary finally became completely Lithuanian when in 1909 professor Jonas Mačiulis-Maironis became the rector of the Seminary, and replaced use of the Polish language for teaching with the Lithuanian language.

Prior to the Second World War, Kaunas, like many cities in Eastern Europe, had a significant Jewish population. According to the Russian census of 1897, Jews numbered 25,500, 35.3% of the total of 73,500. The population was recorded as 25.8% Russian, 22.7% Polish, 6.6% Lithuanian. It established numerous schools and synagogues and were important for centuries to the culture and business of the city.

During the Imperial Russian Army's Great Retreat of World War I, Paul von Hindenburg's German Tenth Army occupied Kaunas in August 1915.

Interwar Lithuania

After Vilnius was occupied by the Red Army in 1919, the Government of the Republic of Lithuania established its main base in Kaunas during the Lithuanian Wars of Independence. Later, after the capital, Vilnius, had been annexed by the Second Polish Republic, Kaunas became the temporary capital of Lithuania. It would hold this position until 28 October 1939, when the Red Army handed Vilnius over to Lithuania after its invasion of Poland. The Constituent Assembly of Lithuania first met in Kaunas on 15 May 1920. It passed some important laws, particularly on land reform, on the national currency, and adopted a new constitution. The military coup d'état took place in Kaunas on 17 December 1926. It was largely organized by the military, especially general Povilas Plechavičius, and resulted in the replacement of the democratically elected Government and President Kazys Grinius with a conservative nationalist authoritarian Government led by Antanas Smetona. Shortly afterwards, tension between Antanas Smetona and Augustinas Voldemaras, supported by the Iron Wolf Association, arose seeking to gain authority. After the unsuccessful coup attempt in June 1934, Voldemaras was imprisoned for four years and received an amnesty on condition that he leave the country.

During the interwar period, Kaunas was nicknamed the Little Paris because of its rich cultural and academic life, fashion, Art Deco architecture, Lithuanian National Romanticism architectural style buildings as well as popular furniture, interior design of the time and widespread café culture. The interim capital and the country itself also had a Western standard of living with sufficiently high salaries and low prices. At the time, qualified workers there were earning very similar real wages to workers in Germany, Italy, Switzerland and France, the country also had a surprisingly high natural increase in population of 9.7 and the industrial production of Lithuania increased by 160% from 1913 to 1940. The population of Kaunas increased 8,6 times during the interwar period from ~18,000 to ~154,000 residents.

Between the World Wars, industry prospered in Kaunas, which was the largest city in Lithuania. Under the direction of Mayor Jonas Vileišis (1921–1931) Kaunas grew rapidly and was extensively modernised. All of the city's streets were paved, horse-drawn transportation was replaced with modern bus lines, new suburbs were planned and built (Žaliakalnis neighbourhood in particular), and new parks and squares were established. The foundations of a social security system were laid, three new schools were built, and new public libraries, including the Vincas Kudirka library, were established. Vileišis maintained many contacts in other European cities, and as a result, Kaunas was an active participant in European urban life.

The city also was a particularly important centre for the Lithuanian Armed Forces. In January 1919, during the Lithuanian Wars of Independence, the War School of Kaunas was established and started to train soldiers who were soon sent to the front to strengthen the fighting Lithuanian Armed Forces. Part of the Lithuanian armoured vehicles military unit was moved to Žaliakalnis, armed with advanced and brand new tanks, including the famous Renault FT, Vickers-Armstrong Model 1933 and Model 1936. In May 1919, the Lithuanian Aircraft State Factory was founded in Freda to repair and to supply the army with military aircraft. It was considerably modernized by Antanas Gustaitis and started to build Lithuanian ANBO military aircraft. The exceptional discipline and regularity caused the Lithuanian Air Force to be an example for other military units. The ANBO 41 was far ahead of the most modern foreign reconnaissance aircraft of that time in structural features, and most importantly in speed and in rate of climb.

In 1934–1935, the first mass trial of the Nazis in Europe was held in Kaunas in which the convicted were sentenced to imprisonments in a heavy labor prison and to capital punishment.

At the time, Kaunas had a Jewish population of 35,000–40,000, about one quarter of the city's total population. Jews made up much of the city's commercial, artisan, and professional sectors. Kaunas was a centre of Jewish learning, and the yeshiva in Slobodka (Vilijampolė) was one of Europe's most prestigious institutes of higher Jewish learning. Kaunas had a rich and varied Jewish culture. There were almost 100 Jewish organizations, 40 synagogues, many Yiddish schools, 4 Hebrew high schools, a Jewish hospital, and scores of Jewish-owned businesses. It was also an important Zionist centre.

Initially prior to World War II, Lithuania declared neutrality. However, on 7 October 1939, the Lithuanian delegation departed to Moscow, where it later had to sign the Soviet–Lithuanian Mutual Assistance Treaty because of the unfavorable situation. The treaty resulted in five Soviet military bases with 20,000 troops established across Lithuania in exchange for Lithuania's historical capital Vilnius. According to the Lithuanian Minister of National Defence Kazys Musteikis, Lithuanian Minister of Foreign Affairs Juozas Urbšys initially told that Lithuanians refused Vilnius Region as well as the Russian garrisons, but the nervous Joseph Stalin replied, "No matter if you take Vilnius or not, the Russian garrisons will enter Lithuania anyway". He also informed Juozas Urbšys about the Soviet–German secret protocols and showed maps of the spheres of influence. Two of the military bases with thousands of Soviet soldiers were established close to Kaunas in Prienai and Gaižiūnai. Despite regaining the beloved historical capital, the Presidency and the Government remained in Kaunas.

On 14 June 1940, just before midnight, the last meeting of the Lithuanian government was held in Kaunas. During it, the ultimatum presented by the Soviet Union was debated. President Antanas Smetona categorically declined to accept most of the ultimatum's demands, argued for military resistance and was supported by Kazys Musteikis, Konstantinas Šakenis, Kazimieras Jokantas, however the Commander of the Armed Forces Vincas Vitkauskas, Divisional General Stasys Raštikis, Kazys Bizauskas, Antanas Merkys and most of the Lithuanian government members decided that it would be impossible, especially the previously-stationed Soviet soldiers, and accepted the ultimatum. On that night before officially accepting the ultimatum, the Soviet forces executed the Lithuanian border guard  near the Byelorussian SSR border. In the morning, the Lithuanian Government resigned, and the president left the country to avoid the fate of the Soviets' puppets and in the hope of forming a government-in-exile. Soon the Red Army flooded Lithuania through the Belarus–Lithuania border with more than 200,000 soldiers and took control of the most important cities, including Kaunas where the heads of state resided. The Lithuanian Armed Forces were ordered not to resist, and the Lithuanian Air Force remained on the ground. At the time, the Lithuanian Armed Forces had 26,084 soldiers (of which 1,728 officers) and 2,031 civil servants. While the Lithuanian Riflemen's Union, subordinate to the army commander, had over 62,000 members, of which about 70% were farmers and agricultural workers.

After the occupation, the Soviets immediately took brutal action against the high-ranking officials of the state. Both targets of the ultimatum, Minister of the Interior Kazys Skučas and the Director of the State Security Department of Lithuania Augustinas Povilaitis, were transported to Moscow and later executed. Antanas Gustaitis, Kazys Bizauskas, Vytautas Petrulis, Kazimieras Jokantas, Jonas Masiliūnas, Antanas Tamošaitis also faced that fate, and President Aleksandras Stulginskis, Juozas Urbšys, Leonas Bistras, Antanas Merkys, Pranas Dovydaitis, Petras Klimas, Donatas Malinauskas and thousands of others were deported. Stasys Raštikis, persuaded by his wife, secretly crossed the German border. After realizing this, NKVD started terror against the Raštikis family. His wife was separated from their one-year-old daughter and brutally interrogated at Kaunas Prison, his old father Bernardas Raštikis, three daughters, two brothers and sister were deported to Siberia. Soldiers, officers, senior officers and generals of the Lithuanian Army and LRU members, who were seen as a threat to the occupiers, were quickly arrested, interrogated and released to the reserve, deported to the concentration camps or executed, which made many, trying to avoid that fate, join the Lithuanian partisan forces. The army itself was initially renamed the Lithuanian People's Army but was later reorganised into the 29th Rifle Corps of the Soviet Union.

Soviet occupation and June Uprising

In June 1940, the Soviet Union occupied and annexed Lithuania in accordance with the Molotov–Ribbentrop Pact. Vladimir Dekanozov, a Soviet emissary from Moscow, gained effective power in Lithuania. Shortly afterwards, on 17 June 1940 the puppet People's Government of Lithuania was formed, which consistently destroyed Lithuanian society and political institutions and opened the way for the Communist Party to establish itself. To establish the legitimacy of the government and design the plans of Lithuania's "legal accession to the USSR", on 1 July, the Seimas of Lithuania was dismissed, and elections to the puppet People's Seimas were announced. The controlled (passports had imprints) and falsified elections to the People's Seimas were won by the Lithuanian Labour People's Union, which obeyed the occupiers' proposal to "ask" the Soviet authorities to have Lithuania admitted to the Soviet Union.

After the occupation, the Lithuanian Diplomatic Service did not recognize the new occupiers' authority and started the diplomatic liberation campaign of Lithuania. In 1941, Kazys Škirpa, Leonas Prapuolenis, Juozas Ambrazevičius and their supporters, including the former Commander of the Lithuanian Army General Stasys Raštikis, whose whole family was deported to Siberia, began organizing an uprising. After realizing the reality of the repressive and brutal Soviet rule, in the early morning of 22 June 1941 (the first day when the Nazi Germany attacked the Soviet Union), Lithuanians began the June Uprising, which was organized by the Lithuanian Activist Front, in Kaunas, where its main forces were concentrated. The uprising soon expanded to Vilnius and other locations. Its main goal was not to fight the Soviets but to secure the city from the inside (secure organizations, institutions, enterprises) and declare independence. By the evening of 22 June, the Lithuanians had controlled the Presidential Palace, post office, telephone and telegraph, and radio station. Control of Vilnius and most of the rest of Lithuanian territory was also shortly taken over by the rebels.

Multiple Red Army divisions stationed around Kaunas, including the brutal 1st Motor Rifle Division NKVD responsible for the June deportation, and the puppet Lithuanian Soviet Socialist Republic regime commanders were forced to flee into the Latvian SSR through the Daugava River. The commander of the Red Army's 188th Rifle Division colonel Piotr Ivanov reported to the 11th Army Staff that during the retreat of his division through Kaunas "local counterrevolutionaries from the shelters deliberately fired on the Red Army, the detachments suffering heavy losses of soldiers and military equipment". About 5,000 occupants were killed in Lithuania.

On 23 June 1941 at 9:28 am Tautiška giesmė, the national anthem of Lithuania, was played on the radio in Kaunas. Many people listened to the Lithuanian national anthem with tears in their eyes. From Kaunas radio broadcasts, Lithuania learned that the rebellion was taking place in the country, the insurgents took Kaunas and the Proclamation of the Independence Restoration of Lithuania and the list of the Provisional Government were announced by Leonas Prapuolenis. The message was being repeated several times in different languages. The Provisional Government hoped that Nazi Germany would re-establish Lithuanian independence or at least allow some degree of autonomy (similar to the Slovak Republic), was seeking the protection of its citizens and did not support the Nazis' Holocaust policy. However, the Provisional Government did little to stop the anti-Jewish violence encouraged by the Nazis and the anti-Semitic leadership of the Lithuanian Activist Front.

Minister of National Defence General Stasys Raštikis met personally with the Wehrmacht generals to discuss the situation. He approached the Kaunas War Field Commandant General Oswald Pohl and the Military Command Representative General Karl von Roques by trying to plead for him to spare the Jews, but they replied that the Gestapo is handling those issues and that they could not help. Furthermore, in the beginning of the occupation, the prime minister of the Provisional Government of Lithuania, Juozas Ambrazevičius, convened the meeting in which the ministers participated together with the former President Kazys Grinius, Bishop Vincentas Brizgys and others. Ministers expressed distress at the atrocities being committed against the Jews but advised only that "despite all the measures which must be taken against the Jews for their Communist activity and harm done to the German Army, partisans and individuals should avoid public executions of Jews". According to the Lithuanian-American Holocaust historian Saulius Sužiedėlis, "none of this amounted to a public scolding which alone could have persuaded at least some of the Lithuanians who had volunteered or been co-opted into participating in the killings to rethink their behavior." Lithuanian police battalions formed by the Provisional Government were eventually enlisted by the Nazis to help carry out the Holocaust.

In the first issue of the daily Į laisvę (Towards Freedom) newspaper, the Independence Restoration Declaration was published, which had been previously announced on the radio. It stated that "The established Provisional Government of revived Lithuania declares the restoration of the Free and Independent State of Lithuania. The young Lithuanian state enthusiastically pledges to contribute to the organization of Europe on a new basis in front of the whole world innocent conscience. The Lithuanian Nation, exhausted from the terror of the brutal Bolsheviks, decided to build its future on the basis of national unity and social justice." and signatures.

On 24 June 1941, tank units of the Red Army in Jonava were ordered to retake Kaunas. The rebels radioed the Germans for assistance. The units were bombed by the Luftwaffe and did not reach the city. It was the first coordinated Lithuanian–German action. The first German scouts, lieutenant Flohret and four privates, entered Kaunas on 24 June and found it in friendly hands. A day later the main forces marched into the city without obstruction and almost as if they were on parade.

Nazi occupation

On 26 June 1941 the German Oberkommando der Wehrmacht ordered the rebel groups to disband and disarm. Two days later Lithuanian guards and patrols were also relieved of their duties. Already in July, in a conversation the Tilsit Nazi Gestapo agent Dr  clearly stated to Stasys Raštikis that the Provisional Government was formed without German knowledge. Such a form, although not having anything against individuals, is unacceptable to the Germans. The current Provisional Government should be transformed into a National Committee or Council under the German military authority. The Nazi Germans did not recognize the new Provisional Government, but they did not take any action to dissolve it. The Provisional Government, not agreeing to continue to be an instrument of the German occupiers, disbanded itself on 5 August 1941 after signing a protest for the Germans action of suspending the Lithuanian Government powers. Members of the Provisional Government then went as a body to the Garden of the Vytautas the Great War Museum, where they laid a wreath near the Tomb of the Unknown Soldier in the presence of numerous audience. The Sicherheitsdienst confiscated the pictures of the wreath-laying ceremony, thinking that it could be dangerous for the German occupation policy in Lithuania.

On 17 July 1941 the German civil administration was established. The government's powers were taken over by the new occupants. Nazi Germany established the Reichskommissariat Ostland in the Baltic states and much of Belarus, and the administrative centre for Lithuania (Generalbezirk Litauen) was in Kaunas ruled by a Generalkommissar Adrian von Renteln.

Jewish community of Kaunas

Jews began settling in Kaunas in the second half of the 17th century. They were not allowed to live in the city, so most of them stayed in the Vilijampolė settlement on the right bank of the Neris river. Jewish life in Kaunas was first disrupted when the Soviet Union occupied Lithuania in June 1940. The occupation was accompanied by arrests, confiscations, and the elimination of all free institutions. Jewish community organizations disappeared almost overnight. Soviet authorities confiscated the property of many Jews, while hundreds were exiled to Siberia.

As the Second World War began, there were 30,000 Jews living in Kaunas, comprising about 25% of the city's population. When the Soviet Union took over Lithuania in 1940, some Jewish Dutch residents in Lithuania approached the Dutch consul Jan Zwartendijk to get a visa to the Dutch West Indies. Zwartendijk agreed to help them and Jews who had fled from German-occupied Poland also sought his assistance. In a few days, with the help of aides, Zwartendijk produced over 2,200 visas for Jews to Curaçao. Then refugees approached Chiune Sugihara, a Japanese consul, who gave them a transit visa through the USSR to Japan, against the disapproval of his government. This gave many refugees an opportunity to leave Lithuania for the Russian Far East via the Trans-Siberian Railway. The fleeing Jews were refugees from German-occupied Western Poland and Soviet-occupied Eastern Poland, as well as residents of Kaunas and other Lithuania territories. The Sugihara House, where he was previously issuing transit visas, currently is a museum and the Centre For Asian Studies of Vytautas Magnus University.

Following Hitler's invasion of the Soviet Union on 22 June 1941, Soviet forces fled from Kaunas. Both before and during the German occupation starting 25 June, the anti-Communists, encouraged by the anti-Semitic leadership of the Berlin-based Lithuanian Activist Front (LAF), began to attack Jews, blaming them for the Soviet repressions, especially along Jurbarko and Kriščiukaičio streets. The LAF's manifesto-type essay "What Are the Activists Fighting for?" states: "The Lithuanian Activist Front, by restoring the new Lithuania, is determined to carry out an immediate and fundamental purging of the Lithuanian nation and its land of Jews ...". Nazi authorities took advantage of the Lithuanian TDA Battalions and established a concentration camp at the Seventh Fort, one of the city's ten historic forts, and 4,000 Jews were rounded up and murdered there. The Kaunas pogrom was a massacre of Jewish people living in Kaunas that took place on 25–29 June 1941; the first days of the Operation Barbarossa and of Nazi occupation of Lithuania. Prior to the construction of the Ninth Fort museum on the site, archaeologists unearthed a mass grave and personal belongings of the Jewish victims. The Ninth Fortress has been renovated into a memorial for the wars and is the site where nearly 50,000 Lithuanians were killed during Nazi occupation. Of these deaths, over 30,000 were Jews.

Soviet administration

Beginning in 1944, the Red Army began offensives that eventually led to the reconquest of all three of the Baltic states. Kaunas was captured on 1 August 1944 and this led to the continuation of Soviet repressions.

Kaunas again became the major centre of resistance against the Soviet Union. From the very start of the Lithuanian partisans war, the most important partisan districts were based around Kaunas. Although guerrilla warfare ended by 1953, Lithuanian opposition to Soviet rule did not. In 1956 people in the Kaunas region supported the uprising in Hungary by rioting.

On All Souls' Day in 1956, the first public anti-Soviet protest rally took place in Kaunas: citizens burned candles in the Kaunas military cemetery and sang national songs, resulting in clashes with the Militsiya.

On 14 May 1972, 19-year-old Romas Kalanta, having proclaimed "Freedom for Lithuania!", immolated himself in the garden of the Musical Theatre, after making a speech denouncing the Soviet suppression of national and religious rights. The event broke into a politically-charged riot, which was forcibly dispersed by the KGB and Militsiya. It led to new forms of resistance: passive resistance all around Lithuania. The continuous oppression of the Catholic Church and its resistance caused the appearance of the Chronicle of the Catholic Church in Lithuania. In strict conspiracy, Catholic priest Sigitas Tamkevičius (now the Archbishop Metropolitan of Kaunas) implemented this idea and its first issue was published in the Alytus district on 19 March 1972. The Kronika started a new phase of resistance in the life of Lithuania's Catholic Church and of all Lithuania fighting against the occupation by making known to the world the violation of the human rights and freedoms in Lithuania for almost two decades. 

On 1 November 1987, a non-sanctioned rally took place near the Kaunas Cathedral Basilica, where people gathered to mark famous Lithuanian poet Maironis' 125th-birthday anniversary. On 10 June 1988, the initiating group of the Kaunas movement of Sąjūdis was formed. On 9 October 1988, the Flag of Lithuania was raised above the tower of the Military Museum. Kaunas, along with Vilnius, became the scene of nearly constant demonstrations as the Lithuanians, embarked on a process of self-discovery. The bodies of Lithuanians who died in Siberian exile were brought back to their homeland for reburial, and the anniversaries of deportations as well as the important dates in Lithuanian history began to be noted with speeches and demonstrations.

On 16 February 1989 Cardinal Vincentas Sladkevičius, for the first time, called for the independence of Lithuania in his sermon at the Kaunas Cathedral. After the services, 200,000 persons gathered in the centre of Kaunas to participate in the dedication of a new monument to freedom to replace the monument that had been torn down by the Soviet authorities after World War II.

Restored independence 

After World War II Kaunas became the main industrial city of Lithuania; it produced about a quarter of Lithuania's industrial output.

After the proclamation of Lithuanian independence in 1990, Soviet attempts to suppress the rebellion focused on the Sitkūnai Radio Station. They were defended by the citizenry of Kaunas. Pope John Paul II said Holy Mass for the faithful of the Archdiocese of Kaunas at the Kaunas Cathedral Basilica and held a meeting with the young people of Lithuania at the S. Darius and S. Girėnas Stadium, during his visit to Lithuania in 1993. Kaunas natives Vytautas Landsbergis and Valdas Adamkus became the Head of state in 1990, and, respectively, in 1998 and 2004. Since the restoration of independence, substantially improving air and land transport links with Western Europe have made Kaunas easily accessible to foreign tourists.

Kaunas is famous for its basketball club, Žalgiris, which was founded in 1944 and was one of the most popular nonviolent expressions of resistance during its struggle with the CSKA Moscow. In 2011, the largest indoor arena in the Baltic states was built and was named Žalgiris Arena. Kaunas hosted finals of the EuroBasket 2011.

In March 2015, Kaunas's interwar buildings received the European Heritage Label. On 10 January 2017, Kaunas's interwar modern architecture was included in the UNESCO World Heritage Site Tentative List.

On 29 March 2017, Kaunas was named European Capital of Culture of 2022.

On 28 September 2017, the winner of the M. K. Čiurlionis Concert Centre architectural competition was announced and the centre is planned to be completed by 2022, close to the Vytautas the Great Bridge.

Geography

The city covers 15,700 hectares. Parks, groves, gardens, nature reserves, and agricultural areas occupy 8,329 hectares. The city follows in suit of the country and is lowland.

Administrative divisions
Kaunas is divided into the following elderships:

Climate

Despite its northern location, the climate in Kaunas is relatively mild compared to other locations at similar latitudes, mainly because of the Baltic Sea. Because of its latitude, Kaunas has 17 hours of daylight in midsummer but only around 7 hours in midwinter. The Kazlų Rūda Forest, west of Kaunas, creates a microclimate around the city, regulating humidity and temperature of the air, and protecting it from strong westerly winds.

Spring and autumn are generally cool to mild.

Religion
Prominent religious features of Kaunas include:

 Vytautas' Church, one of the oldest churches in Lithuania and the oldest in Kaunas
 St. Gertrude Church in Kaunas
 Kaunas Cathedral Basilica, the largest Gothic building in Lithuania, with a late Baroque interior
 St. George's Church, which was rumoured to have been turned into a dance studio during the Soviet occupation
 Pažaislis monastery, an impressive complex in Baroque style
 St. Francis Xavier Church
 Neo-Byzantine church of St. Michael the Archangel
 Christ's Resurrection Church with an unfolding panoramic view of the city
 Kaunas Synagogue
 Kaunas Mosque

Culture

Kaunas is a city centered around culture. The Old Town of Kaunas is located at the confluence of the Nemunas and Neris Rivers where old architectural monuments and other historical buildings are located. Located to the East of the Old Town is the city's New Town, which started developing in 1847 and got its name when it became a distinct part of the city. Central Kaunas is defined by two pedestrian streets: the 2-km-long Laisvės alėja (Liberty Avenue), a central street of the city, lined by linden trees and decorated with flower beds.

The Old Town is the historical center of Kaunas. The streets in Old Town have been turned to pedestrian sidewalks, so it is best to tour the place by foot. Prominent features of the Old Town include Kaunas Castle, the Town Hall, and the historical Presidential Palace. The Town Hall in Kaunas played an important role in the Medieval Times as a center for trade, festivals, and criminals were brought here for punishment. The Town Hall was originally built with wooden frames, however, after numerous fires in 1542 they began to construct buildings with stone. The stone buildings, however, also burned down so the Town Hall that stands today was constructed in a more advanced way, which took from 1771 to 1780. The Town Hall is still a center of culture today, it holds weddings and is the home of the Museum of Ceramics.

Other historical, cultural features of Kaunas include:

 Tomb of the Unknown Soldier, Eternal flame, and Statues of Lithuanian national renaissance figures are located in the Vienybės square in front of the War museum
 Kaunas Fortress, one of the largest defensive structures in Europe, occupying 65 km2 (25 sq mi), a 19–20th century military fortress, which includes a Holocaust site of the Ninth Fort
 House of Perkūnas
 Interbellum functionalism architecture complexes
 Two funiculars – Žaliakalnis Funicular Railway and the Aleksotas Funicular Railway
 Lithuanian open-air Ethnographic Museum displaying the heritage of Lithuanian rural life in a vast collection of authentic resurrected buildings is situated east of Kaunas on the bank of Kaunas Reservoir in a town of Rumšiškės
 Kaunas Cultural Centre of Various Nations

Museums

Kaunas is often called a city of museums, because of the abundance and variety of them. The museums in Kaunas include:
 the War Museum of Vytautas the Great
 the M. K. Čiurlionis National Art Museum, commemorating the work of the early 20th century avant-garde artist M. K. Čiurlionis who sought to combine painting and music into a single artistic medium
 the Žmuidzinavičius Museum (best known as the Devils' Museum), which houses a collection of more than two thousand sculptures and carvings of devils from all over the world, most of them of folk provenance. Of particular interest are the Adolf Hitler and Joseph Stalin devils, together doing the dance of death over a playground littered with human bones
 Lithuanian Aviation Museum
 Museum of the History of Lithuanian Medicine and Pharmacy
 Historical Presidential Palace, displaying exhibits from the interwar period
 Kaunas Museum for the Blind
 Maironis Lithuanian Literature Museum
 Kaunas Picture Gallery
 Mykolas Žilinskas Art Gallery
 Povilas Stulga Museum of Lithuanian Folk Instruments
 Tadas Ivanauskas Zoological Museum
 Sugihara house-museum
 The so-called ab underground printing house was a part of the nonviolent resistance press during the Soviet times. Although the AB printing house worked regularly, it was never detected by KGB. It was included into the Registry of Immovable Cultural Heritage Sites of Lithuania in 1999.
 The apartments of some famous Kaunas natives, including Paulius Galaunė, Adam Mickiewicz, Juozas Grušas, Balys Sruoga, Juozas Tumas-Vaižgantas, Salomėja Nėris, Juozas Zikaras, Vincentas Sladkevičius have been turned into public museums.

Theaters

Kaunas is notable for the diverse culture life. Kaunas Symphony Orchestra is the main venue for classical music concerts. There is an old circus tradition in Kaunas. There was established static circus in the Vytautas park of Kaunas in the beginning of the 19th century. The only professional circus organisation in Lithuania, the Baltic Circus, was founded in Kaunas in 1995. Kaunas theatres play an important role in Lithuanian society. There are at least seven professional theatres, many amateur theatres, ensembles and abundant groups of art and sports. Some of the best examples of cultural life in Kaunas are theatres of various styles:
 Kaunas State Drama Theatre
 Kaunas State Musical Theatre
 Kaunas Pantomime Theatre
 Kaunas Chamber Theatre
 Kaunas Dance Theatre Aura
 Kaunas State Puppet Theatre

Cityscape

Urbanism and architecture

The city plan is mixed. The rectangular old town at the confluence of the Nemunas and the Neris rivers is rich in valuable buildings and their complexes. During the Gothic period, the Kaunas Castle (13th–16th centuries), Old Kaunas Ducal Palace (15th century), Church of Vytautas the Great (beginning of the 15th century; also known as the Church of the Assumption of the Blessed Virgin Mary), Church of Saint Nicholas (late 15th century), St. George's Church and the Bernardine Monastery (1472), Church of St. Gertrude (15th–16th centuries; also has Renaissance elements), Kaunas Cathedral Basilica (construction began in the 15th century; later was reconstructed and expanded), Kaunas Town Hall (construction began in 1542; later gained late Baroque and early Classicism forms), House of Perkūnas (late 15th century – early 16th century), residential houses in the Town Hall Square, Vilnius and Kurpių Streets were built. The ensemble of the Church of the Holy Trinity and the Bernardine monastery (started in the late 16th century), the so-called Napoleonic House (16th century) has Gothic, Renaissance, Baroque and Mannerist architecture features. The Renaissance remains of Kaunas defensive fortifications have survived (2nd half of the 17th century).

One of the most famous monuments of Baroque architecture is the ensemble of Pažaislis Church and Monastery (started in 1667, architects G. Frediani, C. Puttini, P. Puttini). Other Baroque style buildings: Kaunas Lutheran Holly Trinity Church (1683; in 1862 Romanticism style bell tower was built, its architect was J. Woller), Corpus Christi Church (1690, in 1866 was reconstructed to an Orthodox church gained Byzantine forms), Church of St. Francis Xavier (1720; towers were built in 1725); Baroque and Classicism elements: the ensemble of the Church of the Holy Cross (1690) and the Carmelite Monastery (1777), Siručiai Palace (18th century; also known as Maironis House, from 1936 is used as the Maironis Lithuanian Literature Museum).

Forms of classicist architecture are typical in the Aukštoji Freda Manor (early 19th century), post station building complex (early 19th century; architect J. Poussier). Notable buildings of the Historicism period in Kaunas are: Kaunas State Musical Theatre (1892; architect J. Golinevičius; was expanded in the 20th century), St. Michael the Archangel Church (Neo-Byzantine style; architect K. Limarenko), brick style Saulės Gymnasium building (1913; engineer F. Malinovskis, later E. A. Frykas), Kaunas Fortress (1889).

In the first half of the 20th century, when Kaunas became the temporary capital of Lithuania in 1919, the city was extensively modernized and thousands of new buildings were built. From 1918 to 1940 more than 12.000 construction permits were issued in Kaunas, which was an extremely rapid growth for a relatively small-scale city (90.000 inhabitants) that fundamentally changed the city's character. The construction permits resulted in more than 10.000 buildings being built in the city and the area of Kaunas expanded 7,1 times during the interwar period. Neoclassicism prevailed in the 3rd decade of the 20th century (Kaunas School of Arts, built in 1923, Bank of Lithuania building, built in 1928, Palace of Justice and the Parliament with Art Deco elements, built in 1930) and a search for the Lithuanian national style was typical (e.g. residential house of Ragutis factory, built in 1925). The styles of Classicism and Modernism intertwined in buildings built in the beginning of 1930s (e.g. Faculty of Medicine at Vytautas Magnus University, built in 1933, now belongs to the Lithuanian University of Health Sciences, Vytautas the Great War Museum and M. K. Čiurlionis National Art Museum, built in 1936), while Modernism and national style intertwined in the Kaunas Central Post Office (architect F. Vizbaras), built in 1932, Kaunas Garrison Officers' Club Building (architect S. Kudokas and others), built in 1937.

The most notable Rationalism style buildings in Kaunas are: Christ's Resurrection Church (construction began in 1933, but it was converted into a radio factory from 1952 and so it was returned to the believers only in 1990 and was reconstructed in 2005), palaces of Pienocentras (architects Vytautas Landsbergis-Žemkalnis, K. Reisonas), Pažangos with Art Deco decoration elements (architect F. Vizbaras), Physical Culture (architect V. Landsbergis‑Žemkalnis, now belongs to the Lithuanian Sports University), Prekybos, pramonės ir amatų (1938, architect V. Landsbergis‑Žemkalnis), Taupomųjų kasų (1939; architects A. Funkas, B. Elsbergas, A. Lukošaitis; now is the primary building of Kaunas City Municipality); Church of the Most Sacred Heart of Jesus (1938; architect A. Šalkauskis), Military Research Laboratory for the Lithuanian Ministry of National Defense (1938; architect V. Landsbergis‑Žemkalnis; now Faculty of Chemical Technology at Kaunas University of Technology), Kaunas Clinics complex (1939; French architect U. Cassan), Kaunas Sports Hall (1939; engineer A. Rozenbliumas), Pasaka Cinema (1939), Romuva Cinema (1940), residential houses complex in V. Putvinskio Street (formed in 1928–1937). In 2021, an application has been submitted to the UNESCO World Heritage Centre in order to include the Kaunas modernist architecture into the List of World Heritage Sites.

After World War II buildings of pseudoclassical forms were built (e.g. Kaunas railway station, built in 1953), complex engineering structures (Kaunas Hydroelectric Power Plant, built in 1960). From the 7th decade of the 20th century Modernism style buildings were further developed. New residential areas were built (e.g. Kalniečiai, completed in 1985), public buildings (e.g. Industrial Construction Design Institute, 1966, House for Political Education (now part of Vytautas Magnus University), 1976), shopping malls (e.g. Girstupis, 1975, Vitebskas, 1980, Kalniečių, 1986), shops (Viešnagė, 1982, Merkurijus, 1983), galleries (e.g. Kaunas Picture Gallery, 1978, Mykolas Žilinskas Art Gallery, 1989), educational institutions (e.g. Faculty of Light Industry at Kaunas University of Technology, 1983).

In the late 20th century and early 21st century, buildings were built in Kaunas based on the projects of architects V. Adomavičius (e.g. Ąžuolynas Sports Center Complex, 2003), G. Jurevičius (e.g. Peugeot, Toyota, Lexus, Honda car showrooms), A. Kančas (e.g. Aleksotas Church of St. Casimir, 1997, company Kraft Foods Lietuva administrative and laboratory buildings complex, 2001, shopping and entertainment center Akropolis, 2007), A. Karalius (building materials salon Iris, 2002, block of flats Aušros namai, 2005), D. Paulauskienė (e.g. Catherine's Monastery, 2000) E. Miliūnas (e.g. Žalgiris Arena, 2001), G. Janulytė‑Bernotienė (e.g. Library and Health Sciences Information Center of Lithuanian University of Health Sciences, 2007, Center for Science Studies and Business of Kaunas University of Technology Santakos Valley, 2013), G. Balčytis (e.g. Kaunas Bus Station reconstruction, 2017), G. Natkevičius (e.g. Moxy Kaunas Center Hotel), A. Kaušpėdas, V. Klimavičius, D. Laurinaitienė.

Parks, leisure, and cemeteries

The city of Kaunas has a number of parks and public open spaces. It devotes 7.3% of its total land acreage to parkland. Ąžuolynas (literally, "Oak Grove") park is a main public park in the heart of Kaunas. It covers about 63 hectares and is the largest urban stand of mature oaks in Europe. To protect the unique lower landscape of Kaunas Reservoir, its natural ecosystem, and cultural heritage Kaunas Reservoir Regional Park was established in the eastern edge of Kaunas in 1992.

By the initiative of a prominent Lithuanian zoologist Tadas Ivanauskas and biologist Constantin von Regel the Botanical Garden was founded in 1923. It serves not only as a recreational area for public, but also serves as a showcase for local plant life, and houses various research facilities. In addition, Kaunas is home to Kaunas Zoo, the only state-operated zoo in all of Lithuania.

Lithuania's premiere last resting place formally designated for graves of people influential in national history, politics, and arts is Petrašiūnai Cemetery in Kaunas. It is also the burial site of some signatories of the 1918 Act of Independence. There are four old Jewish cemeteries within city limits.

On 23 September 2018, Pope Francis visited Kaunas' Santakos Park as part of a tour of the Baltic states.

Economy

Kaunas Mint produced coins of the Grand Duchy of Lithuania from 17 October 1665 to 15 January 1667 during the reign of Grand Duke John II Casimir Vasa. During the interwar period, the Kaunas Mint was reestablished in 1936 and produced coins of the Republic of Lithuania.

Kaunas is a large center of industry, trade, and services in Lithuania. The most developed industries in Kaunas are amongst the food and beverage industries, textile and light industries, chemical industry, publishing and processing, pharmaceuticals, metal industry, wood processing and furniture industry. Recently information technology and electronics have become part of the business activities taking place in Kaunas. In addition, the city also has large construction industry which includes, but is not limited to commercial, housing and road construction.

Primary foreign investors in Kaunas are companies from the Sweden, United States, Finland, Estonia, Denmark, and Russia.
Head offices of several major International and Lithuanian companies are located in Kaunas, including largest Generic Pharmaceuticals producer in Lithuania "Sanitas", producer of sportswear AB "Audimas", one of the largest construction companies "YIT Kausta", JSC "Senukai", largest producer in Lithuania of strong alcoholic drinks JSC "Stumbras", Finnish capital brewery JSC "Ragutis", JSC "Fazer Gardesis", JSC "Stora Enso Packaging", producer of pharmaceuticals, and the only producer of homoeopathic medicines in Lithuania JSC "Aconitum". Its geographic location causes Kaunas to be considered one of the largest logistics centres in Lithuania. The largest wholesale, distribution and logistics company in Lithuania and Latvia JSC "Sanitex", as well as a subsidiary of material handling and logistics company Dematic in the Baltics have been operated in Kaunas. Currently, Kaunas Public Logistics Centre is being built by the demand of national state-owned railway company Lithuanian Railways.
The "Margasmiltė" company currently has been working on a project that concerns exploitation of Pagiriai anhydrite deposit. The project includes mining of anhydrite, a mine with underground warehouses, building the overground transport terminal, as well as an administrative building. The resources of thoroughly explored anhydrite in the Pagiriai deposit amount to 81.5 million tons.

The Lithuanian Central Credit Union—national cooperative federation for credit unions established in 2001, is located in Kaunas. At present the Lithuanian Central Credit Union has 61 members.

There are also some innovative companies located in Kaunas, such as leading wholesaler of computer components, data storage media "ACME group", internet and TV provider, communications JSC "Mikrovisata group", developer and producer original products for TV and embedded technologies JSC "Selteka". Joint Lithuanian-German company "Net Frequency", based in Kaunas, is a multimedia and technology service provider. Kaunas is also home to R&D department of Dassault Systemes producing world-leading modeling tools software CATIA. A LED lighting assembly plant was opened in Kaunas by South Korean company LK Technology in February 2011. JSC "Baltic car equipment" is one of the leaders in Baltic countries, in the field of manufacturing electronic equipment for automobiles. It also specialises in development of new telemetry, data base creation, mobile payment projects. Kaunas Free Economic Zone established in 1996 has also attracted some investors from abroad, including the development of the new 200 MW Cogeneration Power Plant project, proposed by the Finnish capital company Fortum Heat Lithuania. Before its disestablishment, Air Lithuania had its head office in Kaunas. Kaunas Hydroelectric Power Plant is the largest one in Lithuania.

Some notable changes are under construction and in the stage of disputes. The construction of a new landmark of Kaunas—the Žalgiris Arena—began in the autumn of 2008. It was completed in August 2011. Currently discussions are underway about the further development of the Vilijampolė district on the right bank of the Neris River and the Nemunas River, near their confluence.

In October 2017, an automotive parts and technologies manufacturer Continental AG decided to invest over 95 million euros to build a new factory in Kaunas, which is the largest direct investment from a foreign country.

Kaunas is also known for its programmers, as they developed a software for the American billionaire Robert Pera's Ubiquiti Networks product NanoStation, therefore the company established a R&D division Ubiquiti Networks Europe in Kaunas.

Demographics

1897 Russian census revealed the following linguistic composition in the city (by mother tongue, out of 70,920):
 Yiddish 25,052 – 35%
 Russian language 18,308 – 26%
 Polish language 16,112 – 23%
 Lithuanian language 4,092 – 6%
 German language 3,340 – 5%
 Tatar 1,084 – 2%
 Other 2932 – 4%

According to the official census of 1923, there were 92,446 inhabitants in Kaunas:

 Lithuanians – 58.9% (54,520)
 Jews – 27.1% (25,044)
 Poles – 4.5% (4,193)
 Germans – 3.5% (3,269)
 Russians – 3.2% (2,914)
 Belarusians – 0.2% (171)
 Latvians – 0.1% (123)
 Other – 2.4% (2,212)

Today, with almost 94% of its citizens being ethnic Lithuanians, Kaunas is one of the most Lithuanian cities in the country.

Ethnic composition in 2011, out of a total of 315,933:
 Lithuanians – 93.6%
 Russians – 3.8%
 Ukrainians – 0.4%
 Poles – 0.4%
 Belarusians – 0.2%
 Other – 1.6%

Ethnic composition As of the last census in 2021, out of a total population of 298,753:
 Lithuanians – 94.4%
 Russians – 2.9%
 Ukrainians – 0.3%
 Poles – 0.4%
 Belarusians – 0.2%
 Other – 1.4%

Municipality council

Kaunas city municipality council is the governing body of the Kaunas city municipality and is responsible for municipality laws. The council is composed of 41 members (40 councillors and a mayor) all directly elected for four-year terms.

The council is the member of the Association of Local Authorities in Lithuania.

Mayors

 1995–1997 – Vladas Katkevičius (Conservative)
 1997 – Alfonsas Andriuškevičius (Conservative)
 1997–2000 – Henrikas Tamulis (Conservative)
 2000 – Vytautas Šustauskas (Liberty Union)
 2000 – Gediminas Budnikas (Liberty Union)
 2001–2002 – Erikas Tamašauskas (Liberal)
 2002–2003 – Giedrius Donatas Ašmys (Social Democrat)
 2003–2007 – Arvydas Garbaravičius (Liberal-Centrist)
 2007–2011 – Andrius Kupčinskas (Conservative)
 2011 – Rimantas Mikaitis (Liberal)
 2011–2015 Andrius Kupčinskas (Conservative)
 since 2015 – Visvaldas Matijošaitis (Vieningas Kaunas)

Transportation

Airports

Kaunas International Airport (KUN) is the second-busiest airport in Lithuania and fourth-busiest airport in the Baltic states. In 2016, it handled 740,448 passengers (in addition to 2,488 tons of cargo), down from the peak of 872,618 passengers in 2011. An Irish low-cost airline Ryanair announced Kaunas Airport as their 40th base and first in Central Europe in February 2010. It is one of the oldest still functioning airports in Europe used for tourism and air sports purposes and now hosts the Lithuanian Aviation Museum.

Highways
Kaunas is served by a number of major motorways. European route E67 is a highway running from Prague in the Czech Republic to Helsinki in Finland by way of Poland, Kaunas Lithuania, Riga (Latvia), and Tallinn (Estonia). It is the most important road connection between the Baltic states. Kaunas also is linked to Vilnius to its east and Klaipėda, on the Baltic Sea, via the A1 motorway and Daugavpils (Latvia), via E262(A6) highway.

Bridges

The construction of the Kaunas Railway Tunnel and Railway Bridge across the Nemunas river helped move goods from the eastern part of Russian Empire west to the German Empire and Kaunas grew rapidly in the second part of the 19th century. The oldest part of Kaunas was connected with Žaliakalnis neighbourhood in 1889. The city increased once more when it was connected by bridges with Aleksotas and Vilijampolė districts in the 1920s.[2]

Since Kaunas is located at the confluence of two rivers, there were 34 bridges and viaducts built in the city at the end of 2007, including:
 Vytautas the Great Bridge, connecting Old Town with Aleksotas across the Nemunas
 M. K. Čiurlionis Bridge, an automotive bridge across the Nemunas
 Lampėdžiai Bridge across the Nemunas that serves as western bypass of Kaunas
 Petras Vileišis Bridge, connecting Old Town with Vilijampolė across the Neris River
 Varniai Bridge, connecting Žaliakalnis with Vilijampolė across the Neris River
 The Green railway bridge, built in 1862

Railways

Kaunas is an important railway hub in Lithuania. First railway connection passing through Kaunas was constructed in 1859–1861 and opened in 1862. It consisted of Kaunas Railway Tunnel and the Railway Bridge across the Nemunas river. Kaunas Railway Station is an important hub serving direct passenger connections to Vilnius and Warsaw as well as being a transit point of Pan-European corridors I and IX. Some trains run from Vilnius to Šeštokai, and, Poland, through Kaunas. International route connecting Kaliningrad, Russia and Kharkiv, Ukraine, also crosses Kaunas. The first phase of the Standard gauge Rail Baltica railway section from Šeštokai to Kaunas was completed in 2015.

Hydrofoil 
There used to be a hydrofoil route serving Nida port through Nemunas and across Curonian Lagoon. It has been repeatedly discontinued and reopened, so the most current status is unclear. The company still exists and have its boats in working condition.

Public transportation

The public transportation system is managed by Kauno viešasis transportas (KVT). There are 14 trolleybus routes, 43 bus routes. In 2007 new electronic monthly tickets began to be introduced for public transport in Kaunas. The monthly E-ticket cards may be bought once and might be credited with an appropriate amount of money in various ways including the Internet. Previous paper monthly tickets were in use until August 2009.
Kaunas is also one of the major river ports in the Baltic States and has two piers designated for tourism purposes and located on the banks of Nemunas river and Kaunas Reservoir—the largest Lithuanian artificial lake, created in 1959 by damming the Nemunas near Kaunas and Rumšiškės.

In 2015, Kauno autobusai bought four Van Hool AGG300 to serve the mostly populated 37th route. These are the longest buses used in the Baltic states. The bus station in Kaunas underwent reconstruction for six months and reopened on 23 January 2017. It is the largest and most modern bus station in Lithuania. In 2017, Kauno autobusai began planning to cardinally upgrade the trolleybuses and buses park till the end of 2019. The new Mercedes-Benz minibuses were introduced on 2 September 2019. The first new trolleybuses Škoda 26Tr Solaris were publicly introduced on 30 September 2019. In November 2019, Kauno autobusai signed a contract for 100 new model units of MAN Lion's City 12 hybrid electric buses, which replaced over half of city's old buses.

Kaunas public transport has a mobile app Žiogas which allow to purchase and activate digital tickets using a smartphone. After reaching the E-ticket card's monthly fee (28 Eur), the remaining trips are free of charge until the end of the month.

Kaunas has two funiculars: Žaliakalnis Funicular and Aleksotas Funicular. Both are from 1930s. Aleksotas Funicular works every day from 7am to 7pm (a break from 12pm to 1pm). Žaliakalnis Funicular works from Monday to Friday from 8am to 5pm.

Sports

Sports in Kaunas have a long and distinguished history. The city is home to a few historic clubs such as: LFLS Kaunas football club (est. 1920), LFLS Kaunas baseball club (est. 1922), Granitas Kaunas (handball club, EHF Cup champions in 1987), Žalgiris basketball club (est. 1944, EuroLeague champions in 1999).

Kaunas is home to some historic venues such as: the main stadium of the city—Darius and Girėnas Stadium (total capacity after renovation 15,315), which is also the home stadium for soccer clubs from Kaunas and the Lithuanian national football team established in 1923, and Kaunas Sports Hall, completed in 1939 for the Third European Basketball Championship. Darius and Girėnas Stadium is also used as the only large athletics stadium in Lithuania. On 16 October 2022 the Darius and Girėnas Stadium was reopened as a UEFA 4th class stadium following a reconstruction for 43 million euros.

Ice hockey was first played in Lithuania in 1922. The first Lithuanian ice hockey championship composed of four teams (LFLS, KSK, Kovas, and Macabi) was held in Kaunas, in 1926.

The Kaunas Marathon is an international marathon with thousands of Lithuanian and foreign participants every year.

In July 1938 Kaunas, together with Klaipėda (where sailing and rowing competitions were held), hosted the Lithuanian National Olympiad that gathered the Lithuanian athletes from all around the world.

The university status Lithuanian Academy of Physical Education, founded during the interwar period, is the only state-supported institution of tertiary physical education in Lithuania. The National Football Academy—the national centre for the training of the best Lithuanian young players of football was established in Kaunas in 2006.

BC Žalgiris is based in Kaunas. Žalgiris is considered as one of Europe's strongest basketball clubs and plays in the EuroLeague. Žalgiris plays its home games at Žalgiris Arena, the largest indoor arena in the Baltics. The arena, which aside from sports also hosts concerts, was built in time for the European Basketball Championship of 2011 and hosted the tournament's knockout stage. The arena is used to host sports games as well as concerts. The city is also the birthplace or childhood home of many of the country's top basketball stars, among them Arvydas Sabonis, Šarūnas Marčiulionis, Zydrunas Ilgauskas, Linas Kleiza, Donatas Motiejūnas and Šarūnas Jasikevičius.

The first golf club "Elnias" in Lithuania was opened in Kaunas in 2000.

Nemuno žiedas is the only in Lithuania motor racing circuit, situated in Kačerginė, a small town near Kaunas.

A yacht club operates in the Kaunas Reservoir Regional Park.

A round of the UIM F2 World Championship is held by the site of the old Kaunas Lagoon pier every year. The powerboat race is organised by Edgaras Riabko who also competes in the event.

Kaunas was one of the host cities for the 2021 FIFA Futsal World Cup.

On 19 December 2022 Kaunas was announced as a host city for the 2023 EuroLeague Final Four, the first in Lithuania's sports history.

Education

Kaunas is often referred to as a city of students; there are about 50,000 students enrolled in its universities. The first parochial school in Kaunas was mentioned in 1473. A four-form Jesuit school was opened in Kaunas in 1649. It was reorganized into a college in 1653. The oldest still functioning institution of higher education is Kaunas Priest Seminary, established in 1864.
Other institutes of higher education are:
 Vytautas Magnus University founded in 1922 as the University of Lithuania and renamed Vytautas Magnus in 1930.
 Kaunas University of Applied Sciences (Kaunas College)
 Lithuanian University of Health Sciences
 Kaunas University of Technology – the largest technical university in the Baltic States
 Lithuanian Sports University
 Aleksandras Stulginskis University
 Vilnius University Kaunas Faculty
 Mykolas Romeris University Faculty of Public Security
 Vilnius Academy of Art Kaunas Faculty of Art
 The Santaka Valley – Integrated Science, Studies and Business Centre (Valley)
Kaunas has also a large number of public and private basic and secondary schools, as well as kindergartens and nurseries. Kaunas also has numerous libraries. The most important is the Kaunas County Public Library. It was established as the Central Library of Lithuania in 1919. A part of its collection was transferred to Martynas Mažvydas National Library of Lithuania in 1963. Now the Kaunas County Public Library holds more than 2.2 million volumes in its collection and functions as a depository library of the International Bank for Reconstruction and Development.

Annual events

Kaunas is best known for the Kaunas Jazz Festival, International Operetta Festival, Photo Art Festival "Kaunas photo" or Pažaislis Music Festival, which usually run from early June until late August each year. The open-air concerts of the historical 49-bell Carillon of Kaunas are held on weekends. Probably the longest established festival is the International Modern Dance Festival, which first ran in 1989.
 Kaziukas Fair Kaunas fork (beginning of March)
 International open-air "Kaunas Jazz Festival" (April–May)
 Day of Kaunas city (middle of May)
 Pažaislis music festival (June–August)
 Traditional folk music competition "Play, Jurgelis" (November)
 Christmas tree lighting (end of November)

Significant depictions in popular culture
 Kaunas is one of the starting towns of Lithuania in the turn-based strategy game Medieval II: Total War: Kingdoms.
 Some scenes of HBO's miniseries Chernobyl were filmed in Kaunas.
 HBO's miniseries Catherine the Great, featuring Helen Mirren, was also filmed in the Pažaislis Monastery in Kaunas.
 The 2018 historical drama film Ashes in the Snow is partly based in 1941 in Kaunas.

Notable residents

Twin towns – sister cities

Kaunas is twinned with:

 Białystok, Poland
 Brescia, Italy
 Brno, Czech Republic
 Cava de' Tirreni, Italy
 Ferrara, Italy
 Grenoble, France
 Kharkiv, Ukraine
 Linköping, Sweden
 Lippe (district), Germany
 Los Angeles, United States
 Lutsk, Ukraine
 Lviv Oblast, Ukraine
 Myślibórz, Poland
 Odense, Denmark
 Rende, Italy
 Riga, Latvia
 Rishon LeZion, Israel
 San Martín, Argentina
 Tampere, Finland
 Tartu, Estonia
 Toruń, Poland
 Växjö, Sweden
 Vestfold og Telemark, Norway
 Vestland, Norway
 Wrocław, Poland
 Xiamen, China
 Yaotsu, Japan

The city was previously twinned with:
 Kaliningrad, Russia
 Saint Petersburg, Russia

Honours
A minor planet 73059 Kaunas, discovered by Lithuanian astronomers Kazimieras Černis and Justas Zdanavičius, in 2002, is named after the city of Kaunas.

See also
Das Vort, defunct newspaper

References

External links

 
 
 Tourist Information Centre of Kaunas region
 Kaunas Travel Guide
 
 

 
Capitals of Lithuanian counties
Cities in Lithuania
Cities in Kaunas County
Former national capitals
Holocaust locations in Lithuania
Kovensky Uyezd
Magdeburg rights
Municipalities administrative centres of Lithuania
Municipalities of Kaunas County
Trading posts of the Hanseatic League
Trakai Voivodeship